Đỗ Ngọc Yến, known in America as Yen Ngoc Do (May 25, 1941 — August 17, 2006) was a Vietnamese American newspaper publisher; the founder of Nguoi Viet Daily News,  the oldest and largest Vietnamese daily publication; and a founding father of Little Saigon in Orange County, California. He was born in South Vietnam, and lived for most of his adult life in Southern California.

Biography
Yen Ngoc Do was born on May 25, 1941, in Saigon, Vietnam. He was one of five children (three boys, two girls). His father was a tailor who supported the Việt Minh in its war for independence against France. His mother was a devout Roman Catholic.

Do placed 20th out of 3,000 applicants in an examination to enter Saigon's most prestigious high school. On campus, he demonstrated both his intellectual and leadership abilities, and rose to numerous positions. He became editor of the school newspaper. This was during a period of historic political and social turmoil in Vietnam. The country's long struggle for autonomy against French colonialism would soon erupt into Vietnamese triumph only to have the U.S. begin its controversial military involvement. While the French still ruled Vietnam, Do agitated and organized student protests for freedom, and printed and distributed clandestine communications in support of the liberation movement. Eventually, he began to write, edit, publish and organize public rallies around-the-clock of students and the community-at-large. He captured the attention of public figures, politicians, Western journalists and government officials. Professional journalists began to solicit Do's skill for their own newspapers. At the same time, he diversified his activism to include lobbying and petitioning for more student aid and scholarships, and improved educational resources. The scope of his influence and the impact caused by his relentless advocacy resulted in the government's attempt to remove him from school and to arrest him.

Thus, Do became a teenager on the run. For a year, he bicycled throughout the South to escape arrest. He could not contact his family, who had no knowledge about his safety and welfare.  Without food or shelter from loved ones, Do survived, depending on the mercy and compassion of strangers. He had no essentials. Pedaling from city to village to town to forest to jungle and back to city, he sought rest and comfort where he could. In the process, he had the opportunity to witness the beauty of his native land, the people, and the ravages of war. After he had exhausted his energy and ideas, and when he could continue no more, Do returned home. For the first time in a year, Do embraced his parents and family.

All was not at peace, however. The government had filed a lawsuit against Do for his social activism. On the day of trial, he walked to the courthouse. Lining the streets of Saigon all the way to the door of the courthouse were family, friends, neighbors and strangers who had turned out en masse to support him. When he entered the courtroom, the judge announced that,  due to the popular support of the people, the case would be dismissed. That was Do's first taste of the law—he would always remember it. Do would later obtain a high school diploma after a program of self-study.

In his late teens through college and up until his escape from Vietnam, Do worked as a reporter and editor for several newspapers in South Vietnam and an interpreter for American and French journalists. Like many of his generation, he was fluent in French. In his lifetime, Do would master five languages.

It was during college at the University of Saigon that Do met his wife, Loan, a fellow student. They were married, both at the age of 22, on January 21, 1964 in Saigon. Loan supported her husband in his writings and the increasingly visible role he began to play in the fight against communism. Their support network extended beyond writers and included professionals, Vietnamese and non-Vietnamese, of all backgrounds united in the cause for a free and autonomous Vietnam.

One such friend was a long-time American advisor from the Rand Corporation, a California-based think tank. When Do and his wife made their successful escape to America, it was due in large part to him.  Four days before the Fall of Saigon, the friend offered Do commercial airline tickets he had purchased for Do and his family. They had mere hours to pack.

By this time, the U.S. military had become firmly ensconced in Vietnam. The French war had turned into the American war. Like the French, the Americans, too, would be defeated. Indeed, on April 30, 1975, the communist North Vietnamese Army defeated the Army of the Republic of Vietnam (ARVN). Saigon fell to communist control. Americans were evacuating everywhere—the photographs of them jumping into and clinging onto helicopters as they took off from the rooftop of the American Embassy are unforgettable.

Four days earlier, on April 26, 1975, the Do family left their homeland. Do, Loan, and their three children Anh, Dao and Tung, all left on a plane bound for America. Loan was then pregnant with their fourth child. The parents had told the children to pack for the beach. Because they would be searched and valuables would be absconded, the Do family took only $300 with them. They abandoned their home and their country forever. Do would never again see his mother alive, and he would never again set foot on native soil.

After a brief stop in Guam, the Do family arrived at Camp Pendleton, the Marine Corps base outside of San Diego, California. They were among the first political refugees from Vietnam to arrive at a resettlement camp in 1975. Indeed, they were among the first of all Vietnamese immigrants into America and would, later, become among the first to settle Little Saigon, Orange County. At Camp Pendleton, Do continued his leadership by founding a library. He solicited books and other reading material from U.S. Marines on base. Because he spoke fluent English, American military and civilian authorities who were involved in the Vietnamese resettlement endeavor began to turn to Do for guidance. The refugees relied on him to be their spokesman and advisor.

Inspired partly by this stewardship of common interests and goals, but mainly due to his love for writing and news, Do founded Nguoi Viet Daily News in 1978 in Orange County, California. Nguoi Viet translates into "Vietnamese People." Three years after his arrival on American soil, Do had resumed his lifelong passion.

Nguoi Viet started small. Do began writing, editing and publishing the newspaper in his garage. He now had a fourth child, Lin (born six months after the family settled in America). Do, his wife and children worked on Nguoi Viet in the early stages. It was a four-page weekly. Do was writer, editor, publisher, circulation manager and page designer. He delivered copies of his publication without charge door-to-door.

Eventually, friends who were also Vietnamese refugees joined his cause. Not all were writers, but they signed up, drawn by Do's zeal and drive. Do opened up his home and wallet to help these friends and other newly arrived refugees.  Do and his wife provided them with food, clothing and shelter under their own roof. Do and his wife also paid for and helped with the continuing education of refugees and struggling students.
 
Over the years, under Do's leadership, Nguoi Viet grew into one of the most prestigious ethnic publications in history, having earned its founder and its immigrant community worldwide recognition. Today, the newspaper has a daily circulation of 18,000 across the globe. The newspaper has 50 full-time employees and more than a dozen stringers and correspondents worldwide, based in areas with large Vietnamese enclaves. In the beginning, Do sought to inform and educate his fellow refugees about the American way of life while providing accurate, timely and in-depth news about the Vietnamese homeland under communist rule.

Today, Nguoi Viet is a trusted news source for Vietnamese, Vietnamese-Americans, and the community-at-large.  Its web site is located at www.nguoi-viet.com.  Many non-Vietnamese working or interacting with immigrants also rely on the newspaper for coverage and the insider's view.

In 2004, Nguoi Viet launched Nguoi Viet 2, a weekly English-language section targeted at the younger generation. Its web site is located at www.nguoi-viet.com/nv2. Do's eldest daughter, Anh, founded and steers this publication. Like her father, she is a journalist and helps to manage and build the publication today.

Among many honors, in 1999, Do received the Sky Dunlap Lifetime Achievement Award from the Orange County Press Club.  In 2003, he received the Asian American Journalists Association's Lifetime Achievement Award. Do has also been recognized with an Ethics in Business Award from the Chamber of Commerce in the city of Westminster, home to Little Saigon. Throughout the years, he has also received dozens of citations given in thanks for personal and newspaper donations to community projects, scholarships, internships and to fund fine arts and performing arts programs.

In 2005, a $30,000 Yen Do Scholarly Research Grant was launched at California State University, Fullerton, to foster faculty research into the Vietnamese and Southeast Asian communities.

In 2006, the $25,000 Yen Do Vietnam Fellowship was established at the University of Southern California to fund research and publication of original immigrant stories written by students following an internship at Do's paper.

On August 17, 2006, Do died in Orange County, California, due to complications from diabetes and kidney failure. He was 65. More than 3,000 people attended his viewing and funeral services held over four days, with President George W. Bush and California Governor Arnold Schwarzenegger sending published condolences. The California Legislature adjourned in Do's honor, along with the City Council in his hometown of Garden Grove. In 2008, the world's only museum of news, the Newseum located in Washington, DC, dedicated a permanent exhibit to Do and his lifelong work.

Do is survived by his wife of 42 years, Loan; his daughter Anh, her husband and their daughter; his daughter Dao, her husband and their son; his only son Tung; and his daughter Lin.  Anh carries on her Dad's legacy as a journalist.  Dao is a lawyer licensed to practice before the U.S. Supreme Court in Washington, DC.  Tung serves the Federal Government.  Lin works in real estate.

References
Remembering Yen Ngoc Do: A Vietnamese American Pioneer in the Media
 Brody, Jeff. (2006, August 18). Vietnamese publisher, community leader dies. The Orange County Register
 Tran, Mai & Silverstein, Stuart. (2006, August 18). Yen Do, 65; Publisher of First, Largest U.S. Vietnamese Newspaper. The Los Angeles Times

External links
 Nguoi Viet 2 English

1941 births
2006 deaths
American newspaper publishers (people)
Vietnamese people of the Vietnam War
Deaths from diabetes
Deaths from kidney failure
Vietnamese emigrants to the United States
Vietnamese community activists